Carlos Stella (born 1961 in Buenos Aires) is an Argentine composer.

Self-taught in composition, Stella studied piano at the Buenos Aires National Conservatory of Music and in 1985 he was invited by Krzysztof Penderecki to the Cracow Academy of Music. Back in Buenos Aires he received other scholarships from the Fondo Nacional de las Artes and the Fundación Antorchas and began to work for the Teatro del Sur with director Alberto Félix Alberto. He lives in Berlin, Germany, since 1999.

His style is notable for combining multiple elements of heterogeneous musical traditions like gagaku, Noh and kabuki, sequences and tropes, ragam thanam pallavi, baroque and rococo, kebyar, military bands, Thai piphat, circus music, gamelan, organa, tango, Tibetan ritual music, etc. and for exploring the possibilities of variation, imitation, parody, montage, transcription, copy, quotation, paraphrase, trope and recurrence. Typical is also his use of ideas like kaleidoscope, labyrinth, mosaic, spiral, echo and mirror.

Works
 the frog, the moon, buddha and I, after haiku by Basho, Issa, Buson and Shiki, for female voice and piano
 transformation of an own theme in another one by beethoven for three horns
 pieces for orchestra with mirrors and a countertenor
 trio: or, commedia for oboe, bass trumpet and tuba
 quartet: pastiches, parodies and variations on two themes by stravinsky and berio for piccolo clarinet, trombone, xylorimba and vibraphone
 sinfonia containing various themes which may or may not be recognized by the listener; with many parodies, imitations, variations and mere repetitions affecting them for 31 players
 duetto: a parody, a transcript and an imitation of beckett for bassoon and cello
 hockney's choclo: 10 variations, imitations and paraphrases on piazzolla's arrangement of the tango 'el choclo' after a picture by david hockney for accordion, piano, violin, electric guitar and bass
 adieu à venise, after a poem by Georges Perec, for female voice and accordion
 klavierstück in form eines aus mehreren ab- und umwandlungen, übertragungen und nachahmungen bekannter und unbekannter motive zusammengesetzten mosaiks for piano
 the Indian post: a piece for wind orchestra based on a march by sousa after a south Indian form
 15 movements from la muerte en marcha for orchestra
 brahms im spiegelkabinett, for piccolo, violoncello and piano
 warum rauchst du so viel, lili? based on a play by Tennessee Williams, for accordion and piano
 after all, vinnie, I am your mother! (a piece for two soloists and continuo, a string trio and kagebayashi), for English horn, trumpet, guitar, violin, viola, violoncello, countertenor and piano
 antigonai, an oper based on fragments by sophocles and hölderlin for three choirs and a women's trio
 30 lieder a cappella für eugenia visconti

Music for theatre, film and video
 tango varsoviano and en los zaguanes ángeles muertos by Alberto Félix Alberto
 europa y el toro by Tulio Stella directed by Alberto
 tres obras breves y modernas by Tulio Stella
 dos piezas breves de samuel beckett by César Repetto
 tríptico de exilio by Sergio de Loof
 clowns by Daniel Gentile
 la pasión según san juan by Narcisa Hirsch
 mañana by Lilian Morello
 billard um halb zehn by Manfred Dörner

References
 Trio IAMA 
 Ensemble Saitenblicke 
 Berliner Cappella 
 Matt Rubenstein 
 Silke Lange 
 IMDB

External links
Official website

1961 births
20th-century classical composers
21st-century classical composers
Argentine classical composers
Argentine opera composers
Living people
Male classical composers
Male opera composers
Postmodern composers
20th-century male musicians
21st-century male musicians